Tarek El-Ariss (born 1973) is the James Wright Professor of Middle Eastern studies at Dartmouth College.

Biography
Tarek El-Ariss was born in 1973 in Beirut. He earned a BA in Philosophy from the American University of Beirut and a PhD in Comparative Literature from Cornell University. His works focus on the contemporary Arabic culture, literature and art; new media and cyber culture; digital humanities; Nahda literature and thought; travel writing and the war novel; sci-fi and utopia studies; 18th- and 19th-century French philosophy and literature; gender and sexuality studies; and psychoanalysis and affect theory.

Works
 Trials of Arab Modernity: Literary Affects and the New Political
  Leaks, Hacks, and Scandals: Arab Culture in the Digital Age
 The Arab Renaissance: A Bilingual Anthology of the Nahda (ed.)

References

Dartmouth College faculty
Living people
1973 births
American University of Beirut alumni
Cornell University alumni